George Marshel Dennison (August 11, 1935 – January 3, 2017) was a University President of the University of Montana. He served as such from 1990 to his retirement in 2010. Dennison died from Non-Hodgkin lymphoma on January 3, 2017, at the age of 81. He is also the father of NFL coach Rick Dennison.

References

2017 deaths
Presidents of the University of Montana
1935 births